Josh Kean (born 3 July 1993 in Adelaide, Australia) is an Australian motor-racing driver who has competed in the Dunlop Super2 Series. Kean previously drove for Prodrive Racing Australia in 2017.

Career results

References

Australian racing drivers
1993 births
Living people